Anne Holmberg (born 1938 in Colorado, United States), is an American writer of historical romance novels such as Anne Avery and contemporary romance novels as Kate Holmes. She also signed a novel as Anne Woodard.

Biography
Anne Holmberg was born in 1938 in Colorado (United States), where her family has resided for four generations. She obtained a degree in engineering from the University of Colorado.

She has been a four-time nominee (in 1995, 1996, 1997, and 1999) for a Career Achievement Award from Romantic Times Book reviews.

Bibliography

As Anne Avery

Single novels 
 A Distant Start September 1993
 All's Fair March 1994
 Far Star March 1995
 Hidden Hearts July 1996
 The Snow Queen December 1996
 Summer Fancy July 1997
 Fortune's Fancy February 1998
 The Highwayman's Daughter May 1998
 Bartered Bride March 1999
 Fire & Ice July 2001
 The Lawman Takes a Wife August 2001
 The Bride's Revenge July 2002

Anthologies in collaboration 
 "Dream Seeker" in Enchanted Crossings October 1994 (with Madeline Baker and Kathleen Morgan)
 "A Dance on the Edge" in Lovescape August 1996 (with Phoebe Conn, Sandra Hill and Dara Joy)

As Kate Holmes

Single novels 
 Amethyst and Gold July 1999
 Sand Castles January 2000
 The Wild Swans June 2000

Anthologies in collaboration 
 "Marry and Her Gentlemen" in A Christmas Bouquet November 1999 (with Trish Jensen)
 Here Comes Santa Claus October 2001 (with Sandra Hill and Trish Jensen)

As Anne Woodard

Single novels 
 Dead Aim May 2004

References and sources

1938 births
20th-century American novelists
21st-century American novelists
American romantic fiction writers
American historical novelists
Living people
American women novelists
Women romantic fiction writers
Women historical novelists
20th-century American women writers
21st-century American women writers
Pseudonymous women writers
20th-century pseudonymous writers
21st-century pseudonymous writers